The Norwegian Union of Municipal and General Employees is a trade union in Norway. It has a membership of 395,000 and is affiliated with the Norwegian Confederation of Trade Unions (LO).

It was founded in 2003 as a merger of the Norwegian Union of Municipal Employees and the Norwegian Association of Health and Social Care Personnel.  In 2020, it was joined by the Norwegian Post and Communications Union.

Presidents
2003: Jan Davidsen
2013: Mette Nord

References

Norwegian Confederation of Trade Unions
Trade unions established in 2003